The Hainan International Friendship Park is an under-construction park located on the west bank of the Nandu River, by Sima Slope Island, in Haikou City, Hainan Province, China.

References

External links
 Map

Parks in Haikou
Tourist attractions in Haikou